Strike It Rich is an American game show that aired in syndication during the 1986–87 television season. It was hosted by Joe Garagiola with Theresa Ring as prize model (who only displayed the prizes in taped segments) and Bob Hilton as the announcer. The show was produced by Kline & Friends in association with Blair Entertainment.

Main game
Two couples, one usually a returning champion, competed to move across a bi-level archway by answering trivia questions. Both levels had nine television monitors spanning from one end of the stage to the other, and seven of these monitors had buttons below them. Those monitors were always in play, as was the monitor at the end of each archway. The first monitor in each archway served as the starting position for the couples.

Play started with the couple on the bottom level (usually the returning champions), who were given a choice of a one, two, or three question contract to fulfill. Five possible answers fitting a specific category were displayed on the game board, and the couple chose an answer from the five for each question. Answering enough questions to complete the contract gained the couple control of their respective archway. Failing to complete the contract passed control to the opposing couple, who was given a chance to complete it by answering the remaining questions. If neither couple was able to complete the contract, the category was taken out of play and the first couple was shown the next category and list of answers.

Once a couple gained control, they began to move across the archway. Each monitor displayed either a prize or the show's villain, the bandit. The couple had to successfully pass an amount of monitors equal to the number of questions in the contract. The bandit only appeared in one of the monitors, and his position was shuffled before each turn. The shuffle included all of the open monitors, including ones that might not have been in play on the couple's turn (especially early in the game, when the couples did not have a chance to make significant progress).

The couple pushed the button to determine what was concealed on the monitor. If anything other than the bandit was revealed, the couple won the prize and was given a choice to either stop, bank their prizes, and hold their position, or to keep going to try to pass the remaining monitors, if there were any. If the bandit was revealed at any point in either couple's turn, the couple lost the un-banked prizes and their turn with their progress frozen at the monitor where the bandit was found.

Once a couple's turn ended, a new category and set of answers was revealed. If a couple ended their turn by completing the moves and chose not to bank the prizes, they retained control. However, if a couple ended their turn by banking prizes or by finding the bandit, then the opposing couple received control.

Once one of the couples passed the seventh monitor, one last question called the "Strike It Rich question" awaited them at the end of the archway. This question did not have multiple possible answers and thus did not require the use of the game board. Instead, the card bearing the question was placed in a holder on the monitor and its category was not revealed until Garagiola removed the card from its holder. This question was also asked if time was called when none of the couples passed the seventh monitor.

The first couple to answer their Strike It Rich question won the game and moved on to the bonus round. Answering the question incorrectly cost the couple that did so any unbanked prizes that they had and control went back to the opposing couple who resumed from where they had left off.

Both teams were able to keep any prizes they managed to bank during the course of the game.

Bonus game
In the bonus round, the winning couple had a chance to win $5,000 in cash and a car. Originally, couples had to choose between those two prizes. After several weeks, the choice changed to simply playing for the money or for both the money and the car.

Both sets of monitors were used, with one member of the team playing the top archway and the other the bottom. Before the round began, a series of bandits and pictures of the show's logo, referred to as "dollar signs", were shuffled into place on each archway. To begin, the couple chose whether to reveal what was hidden behind the top monitor or the bottom monitor. One of the monitors had a dollar sign hidden, the other a bandit, and the couple had an equal shot of uncovering both as they progressed.

Each revealed dollar sign was worth $100, while each bandit earned nothing. Depending on the chosen bonus prize, the couple had a certain objective to accomplish. If they chose to play for $5,000, the couple had to uncover five dollar signs and could not uncover more than two bandits. Playing for the car required six dollar signs, and the bandit could not appear more than once. If the couple revealed too many bandits, the round ended and they were credited with any money from the previously revealed dollar signs.

Regardless of the outcome, each winning couple continued playing on the next show.

Episode status
All episodes of the series are presumed to exist. Buzzr debuted episodes of Strike it Rich on Amazon Prime on January 4, 2019. As of early 2020, the episodes were no longer available. Buzzr aired an episode of Strike It Rich on January 17, 2023, as part of its annual "Lost and Found" promotion.

International versions

References

 "Strike It Rich (1986 Game Show)." - Rediff Pages. N.p., n.d. Web. May 28, 2013.

1986 American television series debuts
1987 American television series endings
1980s American game shows
First-run syndicated television programs in the United States
Television series by Fremantle (company)
Television series by Kline and Friends
Television series by 20th Century Fox Television